Catedral, located within Old San Juan, is one of 7 subbarrios of San Juan Antiguo barrio in the municipality of San Juan in Puerto Rico.

History
This subdistrict is named after the San Juan Cathedral, one of the oldest churches in the Americas, which is located here.

Puerto Rico was ceded by Spain in the aftermath of the Spanish–American War under the terms of the Treaty of Paris of 1898 and became an unincorporated territory of the United States. In 1899, the United States Department of War conducted a census of Puerto Rico finding that the population of Catedral was 2,497.

References

External links
 

Old San Juan, Puerto Rico